Frederick Lorne James (February 13, 1945 – June 15, 2016) was a Canadian football player who played for the Calgary Stampeders and Edmonton Eskimos. He won the Grey Cup with Calgary in 1971 and one with Edmonton 1975. He played college football at the University of Alberta in Edmonton.

James was born in Edmonton and worked in the insurance industry after his football career.  He also worked with the Canadian Football League Players' Association.

References

1945 births
2016 deaths
Alberta Golden Bears football players
Calgary Stampeders players
Canadian football defensive linemen
Edmonton Elks players
Players of Canadian football from Alberta
Canadian football people from Edmonton